Cyperus manimae, commonly known as the smoothstem flatsedge or the spectacular flatsedge, is a species of sedge that is native to an area of southern North America, Central America, and northern South America.

The species was first formally described by the botanist Carl Sigismund Kunth in 1816.

See also
List of Cyperus species

References

manimae
Plants described in 1816
Taxa named by Carl Sigismund Kunth
Flora of Arizona
Flora of Argentina
Flora of Mexico
Flora of Bolivia
Flora of Colombia
Flora of Ecuador
Flora of Costa Rica
Flora of Guatemala
Flora of Honduras
Flora of Nicaragua
Flora of Panama
Flora of Peru
Flora of Venezuela